Sammons Point is a village in Otto Township in south-central Kankakee County, Illinois, United States. Initially incorporated as a village on March 21, 2006, it was disincorporated on August 8, 2007, and incorporated again on February 5, 2008. As of the 2010 census it had a population of 279.

The village is part of the Kankakee–Bradley Metropolitan Statistical Area, which includes all of Kankakee County.

History

Failed incorporation
Sammons Point was first created in an effort to fend off the proposed expansion of the Waste Management Corporation's landfill. In March 2006, an incorporation election took place, with 82 people (66.7%) voting in favor of the measure and 41 (33.3%) voting against.

Waste Management, which owned land within the new village, wanted all of their land to be unincorporated and under the jurisdiction of the Kankakee County Board instead of Sammons Point. They challenged the validity of the election in court, claiming that its organizers had not followed proper procedures when presenting their original incorporation petitions. The Circuit Court sided with Sammons Point, but Waste Management prevailed in a June 2007 appeal to the Third Appellate Court in Ottawa. A bid by the village for new hearing on the case was denied on August 8, 2007, and Sammons Point was formally disbanded on September 13.

Successful incorporation
Soon after, efforts to reincorporate the community were revived. A new incorporation election was held on February 5, 2008, with 87 votes (57.2%) cast in favor of reestablishing the village and 65 (42.8%) opposed. Approximately 76 percent of eligible voters participated in the election.

At the November 2016 general election, Sammons Point held a referendum to dissolve, but the referendum was defeated, 30 to 127.

Village government
In August 2006, Mike Watson was named as the village's first mayor by a local court order. Six members were also appointed to serve on the Board of Trustees. They were Stephen Schuricht, Paul Gray, Robert Keller, Budd Meents, Clifford Schroeder and James Turner. Patrick Buescher was appointed to serve as village clerk. They held those positions until municipal elections were conducted in April 2007. In that poll, all of the appointed officials were formally elected. These positions were abolished on September 13, 2007, when Sammons Point was ordered to disband.

Nearly four months after the February 5, 2008, incorporation vote, Circuit Court Judge James B. Kinzer restored Mike Watson to his previous post as mayor. He also named four former village officials and two who had opposed incorporation to the new Board of Trustees. They were Paul Becker, Pat Buescher, Bill Graham, Robert Keller, Budd Meents, and Stephen Schuricht. Becker and Graham were members of the "Concerned Citizens of Otto Township," a group that opposed incorporation for the village.

For the April 2009 Illinois consolidated election, the first after reincorporation, six names were on the ballot for village trustees — Budd E. Meents (80 votes), Patrick Buescher (75), Stephen W. Schuricht (75), Clifford Schroeder (76), Robert Keller (74), and James Turner (80) — with 147 write-in votes.  Michael Watson ran unopposed for village president.

Geography
It is bounded on the northeast by the Iroquois River, a north-flowing tributary of the Kankakee River.

Demographics

Education
Sammons Point is served by the Central Community Unit School District 4 , which is based in the Iroquois County village of Clifton.

References

Villages in Kankakee County, Illinois
Villages in Illinois
Populated places established in 2006
Populated places disestablished in 2007
Populated places established in 2008
2006 establishments in Illinois
2007 disestablishments in Illinois
2008 establishments in Illinois